Maríangeles de Uriarte  (born 7 June 1992) is an Argentine handball player for Argentinos Juniors and the Argentine national team.

She was selected to represent Argentina at the 2017 World Women's Handball Championship.

References

1992 births
Living people
Argentine female handball players
21st-century Argentine women